Bharaul Village Development Community is situated in Sunsari District and its geographic latitude is 26.780872 and longitude is 87.192136. Now it is a part of Baraha Municipality.

Population 
According to the Nepalese National Population Census 2011. The Central Bureau of Statistics Thapathali, Kathmandu November 2012, In Bharaul VDC there are 19,466 total population (among them 8,947 are male and 10,519 are female) and 4,431 households.

References 

Populated places in Sunsari District